Sunder Shyam Chadda (20 February 1920 – 25 April 1951) was an Indian actor in Hindi cinema. He began his career in 1942 and worked in over 30 films until his death in 1951 at the age of 31.

Early life and career
Shyam was born Sunder Shyam Chadha on 20 February 1920 in Sialkot, Punjab but grew up in Rawalpindi. Shyam graduated from Gordon College in Rawalpindi. He was a close friend of Saadat Hasan Manto and was the inspiration to many of his stories. Even after the independence of Pakistan in 1947, their friendship remained strong.

Shyam's film career began in 1942 with the Punjabi film Gowandhi. In 1944, he moved to Bombay and started acting in Hindi films. He acted opposite several of the top actresses of the time such as Nargis, Nigar Sultana, Suraiya and Nalini Jaywant. One of his most famous movies was Bazaar, released in 1949, in which he starred with Nigar Sultana. Some of his other notable films include Nirdosh (1941), W. Z. Ahmed's Man Ki Jeet (1944), Majboor (1948), Char Din (1949), Dillagi (1949), Patanga (1949), Chandni Raat (1949), Meena Bazaar (1950) and Samadhi (1950). His last film was Shabistan (1951), starring opposite Naseem Banu, released in 1951 after his death.

Personal life
Shyam married a Muslim woman, Mumtaz Qureshi (also called “Taji”), and they had two children together. The elder was a daughter, Sahira, and the younger was a son, Shakir, who was born two months after Shyam's death. It was a troubled marriage and according to some reports, Mumtaz had reportedly moved out to live with her sister Zeb Qureshi (a small-time actress in Bombay) before Shyam's death in an accident. However, it is also said that she had gone, as per Indian custom, to her maternal family in order to give birth to her child. After Shyam's sudden death in 1951 in a horse-riding accident, Mumtaz migrated to Pakistan along her elder sister, Zeb Qureshi, who was her closest surviving relative, and they settled in Lahore. Mumtaz later married a Pakistani man named Ansari, due to which Shyam's children were sometimes known by the surname Ansari. Both of Shyam's children thus grew up in Pakistan and were raised as Muslims. Shyam's daughter Sahira Kazmi followed in her late father's footsteps and became an actress, working in Pakistani TV serials. She is married since 1974 to the Pakistani TV actor Rahat Kazmi and they are the parents of two children, Ali (son) and Nida (daughter). Shyam's son Shakir pursued higher education and he is a psychiatrist based in the United Kingdom.

Death and legacy
Shyam died while filming on the set of Shabistan in 1951 after he fell off a horse during filming and fractured his skull. He was immediately rushed to the hospital but did not survive. His few remaining scenes were completed with a body-double who had a similar height to him and filmed from behind without showing his face. This film's shooting was being done in Bombay.

Some people still speculate to this day that had he lived longer, due to his good looks, he would have given stiff competition to the 1950s popular film heroes, Dilip Kumar, Dev Anand and Raj Kapoor.

Veteran film actress Suraiya reportedly said about Shyam:
"I often thought of him as the Errol Flynn of India... ...Shyam was very conscious of his height whenever he was on the sets with me, just as I was very conscious of my short stature whenever I worked with him. He was in the habit of teasing my granny often and had become almost a member of our family."

In media
Manto and Shyam became close friends in real life because they both worked together for Bombay Talkies. In his book titled, 'Stars from Another Sky'; Manto dedicated a chapter to Shyam titled 'Murli Ki Dhun'. In this book, Manto describes Shyam's attempts to flirt with fellow actresses Kuldip Kaur, Nigar Sultana
as well as actress Mumtaz Qureshi. Later, Shyam married Mumtaz Qureshi. Manto found Shyam to be fun-loving, liberal in his thinking and a man with a wandering eye for good looking women.

Tahir Raj Bhasin was seen portraying Shyam in the Indian film Manto (2018), a biopic on the noted writer Saadat Hasan Manto. Before this, a Pakistani film Manto (2015) was also made on Manto's life.

References

External links
Shyam at The Internet Movie Database

1951 deaths
Male actors in Hindi cinema
1920 births
20th-century Indian male actors
People from Sialkot
Punjabi people
Male actors from Rawalpindi
Male actors from Punjab, India
Deaths by horse-riding accident in India